Permanent may refer to:

Art and entertainment
Permanent (film), a 2017 American film
Permanent (Joy Division album)
"Permanent" (song), by David Cook

Other uses
Permanent (mathematics), a concept in linear algebra
Permanent (cycling event)
Permanent wave, a hairstyling process

See also
Permanence (disambiguation)
Permanently, a 2000 album by Mark Wills
Endless (disambiguation)
Eternal (disambiguation)
Forever (disambiguation)
Impermanence, Buddhist concept